Elizabeth Harman is an American philosopher and Laurance S. Rockefeller Professor of Philosophy at Princeton University.

Biography 
Harman's father is Gilbert Harman, professor of philosophy. Harman's mother was Lucy Harman, a psychotherapist at Princeton University.

As a professor of philosophy, Harman is known for her expertise on ethics, specifically on ethics of abortion.

Harman's husband, Alex Guerrero, is Henry Rutgers Term Chair and Associate Professor of Philosophy at Rutgers University.

References

External links
 Elizabeth Harman at Princeton

Living people
21st-century American philosophers
Political philosophers
Philosophy academics
Philosophy journal editors
American women philosophers
Harvard College alumni
MIT School of Humanities, Arts, and Social Sciences alumni
Year of birth missing (living people)
21st-century American women